Mihai Petric (March 7, 1923 – June 15, 2005) was a Moldovan painter. He studied at the "I. Repin" National School of Fine Arts in Chişinău and at the Institute of Fine Arts in Kiev, Ukraine. He was the creator of "Road to Codru" (oil on canvas, 1959), "Dniestr at Dusk" (oil on canvas, 1980), and "White Frost" (oil on canvas, 1987).

References

1923 births
2005 deaths
Moldovan artists
Soviet painters